Lucius Cornelius Lentulus Lupus (died 125 BC) served as a Roman consul in 156 BC alongside his colleague Gaius Marcius Figulus.

Lupus was a member of the Lentuli branch of the gens Cornelia, an elite patrician family. The Latin author Lucilius criticizes Lupus for a decadent and corrupt lifestyle.
Lupus was a member of the priestly college decemviri sacris faciundis.
He was charged with extortion, yet still became censor in 147 BC. From 131 to 125 BC he was the princeps senatus.

References

2nd-century BC Roman consuls
Lupus, Lucius
Roman patricians
125 BC deaths
Year of birth unknown
2nd-century BC diplomats